The 25th Busan International Film Festival took place on October 21 to 30, 2020 at the Busan Cinema Center in Busan, South Korea. A total of 192 films from 68 countries were screened at the festival, the numbers reduced from the previous edition.

The festival was scheduled to be held on October 7-16, 2020, but was postponed due to concern over the spread of COVID-19 after Chuseok holidays. Due to the COVID-19 pandemic, the attendance of BIFF had been downsized and no international guests were invited to the festival. All outdoor events were also cancelled in order to prevent crowds. The screening limit capacity were only up to 50 people. The judging of all films took place online.

The most prestigious awards of the festival, New Currents, were handed to A Balance and Three.

Juries

New Currents
Mira Nair, Indian-American director, Head Juror
Thierry Jobin, Swiss film critic, Fribourg International Film Festival artistic director
Haegue Yang, South Korean visual artist

Kim Jiseok Award
Zhao Tao, Chinese actress
Jung Sung-il, South Korean film critic and director
Mouly Surya, Indonesian director

BIFF Mecenat Award
Nick Deocampo, Filipino director
Park Inho, South Korean film critic
Chalida Uabumrungjit, Thai archive director

Sonje Award
Ifa Isfansyah, Indonesian director
Kim Yi-seok, South Korean film professor
Sharipa Urazbayeva, Uzbekistani director

Actor and Actress of the Year
Chu Sang-mi, South Korean actress and director
Jung Jin-young, South Korean actor and director

FIPRESCI Award
Sanja Struna, Slovenian film critic
Sung Il-kwon, South Korean film critic
Alin Taciyan, FIPRESCI deputy secretary

NETPAC Award
Riccardo Gelli, Florence Korean Film Festival director
Kim Kyoung-wook, South Korean film critic
Hassan Muthalib, Malaysian writer, film critic, and film historian

DGK Megabox Award
Kim Ho-jun, South Korean director
Lee Sang-cheol, South Korean director
Cho Chang-ho, South Korean director

KBS Independent Film Award
Jeong Jae-eun, South Korean director
Ju Sung-chul, South Korean film critic
Kwak Sin-ae, South Korean film producer

CGK&SamyangXEEN Award
Nam Dong-keun, South Korean cinematographer
Park Jung-hun, South Korean cinematographer
Sung Seung-taek, South Korean cinematographer

Official selection

Opening and closing films

Gala Presentation

Icons

A Window on Asian Cinema

Highlighted titles and daggers indicate Kim Joseok Award winners.

New Currents

Highlighted titles and daggers indicate New Currents winners.
Highlighted title and double-dagger indicate FIPRESCI Award winner.
Hashtag indicates KTH Award winner.
Down-arrow indicates CGK&SamyangXEEN Award winner.

Korean Cinema Today

Panorama

Vision

Highlighted title and dagger indicate NETPAC Award winner.
Highlighted titles and double-daggers indicate DGK MEGABOX Award winners.
Section sign (§) indicates CGV Arthouse Award winner.
Hashtag indicates KTH Award winner.
Up-arrow indicates KBS Independent Film Award winner.

World Cinema

Flash Forward

Highlighted title and dagger indicate Flash Forward winner.

Wide Angle

Korean Short Film Competition

Highlighted title and dagger indicate Sonje Award winner.

Asian Short Film Competition

Highlighted title and dagger indicate Sonje Award winner.

Documentary Competition

Highlighted titles and daggers indicate BIFF Mecenat Award winners.

Documentary Showcase

Open Cinema

Awards
The following awards were presented at the 25th edition:
New Currents Award
A Balance by Yujiro Harumoto
Three by Ruslan Pak

Kim Jiseok Award
Drowning in Holy Water by Navid Mahmoudi
The Slaughterhouse by Abbas Amini

BIFF Mecenat Award
The Art of Living in Danger by Mina Keshavarz
Sister J by Lee Soo-jung

Sonje Award
Georgia by Jayil Pak
Mountain Cat by Lkhagvadulam Purev-Ochir

Actor & Actress of the Year Award
Actor of the Year: Ji Soo for Our Joyful Summer Days
Actress of the Year: Lim Seong-mi for Fighter

Flash Forward Award
Tigers by Ronnie Sandahl

FIPRESCI Award
Summer Blur by Han Shuai

NETPAC Award
Fighter by Jéro Yun

DGK MEGABOX Award
Young Adult Matters by Lee Hwan
Good Person by Jung Wook

CGV Arthouse Award
Good Person by Jung Wook

KTH Award
Snowball by Lee Woo-jung
Young Adult Matters by Lee Hwan

KBS Independent Film Award
Limecrime by Lee Seung-hwan and Yoo Jae-wook

CGK&SamyangXEEN Award
Snowball – Cinematography by Lee Jae-u

References

External links 
 

Busan International Film Festival
Busan International Film Festival
2020 in South Korea
Busan International Film Festival
Busan International Film Festival